Yasunobu is a masculine Japanese given name.

Kanji and meaning
The name Yasunobu is composed of two elements yasu and nobu, each of which could be written with a variety of kanji, for example:

yasu:  ("great" or "exalted"),  ("abundant"),  ("health"),  ("peaceful" or "safe")
nobu:  ("extend"),  ("smoothly"),  ("trust")

The same elements can also be written in the opposite order to form the masculine name Nobuyasu.

People
Notable people with the name Yasunobu include:

, Japanese footballer
, Japanese weightlifter
, Japanese footballer
, Japanese quantum physicist
, Japanese sprint canoeist
, Japanese painter
, Japanese daimyō

References

Japanese masculine given names